The history of Ukrainian animation, which began in the late 1920s, is part of Ukrainian cinematography and has involved several techniques, like frame-by-frame filming, time lapse, or three-dimensional pictures.

Ukraine SSR 

The history of Ukrainian animation began in 1927, when Vyacheslav Lewandowski of the All-Ukrainian Photo Cinema Administration in Odessa created the puppet cartoon "Chaff Goby (Solomennyi Biychok)" or "The Tale of the Straw Bull", based on the fairy tale of the same name by Oleksandr Oles. However, the film has now been lost, and the only parts that we know about it were a few shots described by Oleksandr Shimon, a person who watched the film:

Vyacheslav Lewandowski created approximately twelve other works of animation, including the 1927 "Ukrainization" about the introduction of the Ukrainian language as an official language in Ukraine, and the 1928 "Tuk-Tuk and his friend Zhuk" about a boy who grows vegetables with his dog named Zhuk, with a pig and fox described as lazy and aggressive, encroaching on Tuk-Tuk's work in all possible ways.  (This latter cartoon was shown at the Dovzhenko Center in 2017).

In 1934 in Odessa, young animators created the first Ukrainian graphic animated film, Murzilka in Africa, about a fairy tale character named Murzilka who goes to Africa to save a girl named Kane from oppression and cruelty. Started in 1928 by Lewandowski and finished by Lewandowski's students in 1935, the 1938 release of Tuk-Tuk and his friend Zhuk, filmed by two of Lewandowski's students: Semyon Guetsky and Eugene Gorbach, was the first attempt to create a serial animation character. 

The events that followed during World War II and the Holodomor virtually froze this animation art form. Oppression and the ongoing war diminished the animation base in the country. Consequently, development of Ukrainian animation was paused for decades.

Ukrainian animation resumed in the late 1950s, when animator Ipolyt Lazarchuk began making animations. He was in part responsible for the renaissance of Ukrainian animation. The film The Adventures of Pepper was released in 1961, made by a team which apparently didn't have experience animating prior to the making of The Adventures of Pepper. The cartoon tells the story of Pepper, a magazine employee who is approached by animals suffering from poachers who also pollute the forest and river. 

In 1967, the film studio Kievnauchfilm received a letter from a now-unknown resident of Zaporizhzhia, pitching the studio to make a film called How the Cossacks cooked kulish.  The success of the resulting film, now reimagined as a cartoon by Volodymyr Dakhno, kickstarted the Cossacks animation franchise in Ukraine.

Other cartoons in the series included How the Cossacks played football, How the Cossacks liberated the brides, How the Cossacks bought salt, How the Cossacks became Olympians, How the Cossacks helped the musketeers, and How the Cossacks played hockey. There were 9 cartoons in total.  Soviet censors banned work, withheld financing from, or punished artists who did not fit party interests.  The Communist Party had wanted to portray the Cossacks cartoon characters instead as Red Army soldiers. Folktales used in cartoons during this period in the 1970's and 1980's, such as in Cossacks, were altered for Soviet ideology.   Natalie Kononenko wrote:"They not only criticized capitalism, but also depicted women as sexless and self-sacrificing, and urged cooperation, neighborliness, and non-violence.  National minorities within the Soviet Union were portrayed as backward and in need of the guidance of Russia, the leading Soviet republic.  Ukrainians for example, were shown as cute and quaint, living in a bucolic land.  Colorful clothing and tasty foods were attributed to them, as well as the ability to sing and dance.  However, they were also seen as a people who believed in spirits and did not understand modern life."As compared to the Moscow animation studio, Soyuzmultfilm, which sought realism in the model of Disney, Ukrainian animators at Kyivnaukfilm focused more on aesthetics and concept, leading to new styles and techniques that were more conceptual and experimental.

In 1976, the Kievnauchfilm cartoon series Adventures of Captain Wrongel became one of the most well-known cartoons of the Soviet Union, based around a sea captain who competes in a regatta which is linked to a theft from a famed museum. 

The cartoon Kapitoshka was released in 1980, and is about an unlikely friendship between a wolf and the fun-loving rain drop, Kapitoshka.  A young wolf, reading a tutorial about how to become a scary wolf, chases and eventually catches Kapitoshka to cook him.  Kapitoshka escapes in a variety of ways, turning the pursuit into a game leading the wolf to concede futility.  The two eventually become friends before Kapitoshka retreats in a rain cloud. In the 1989 sequel to the original, "Vozvrashaisya, Kapitoshka!" ("Come back, Kapitoshka!"), instead of from a book, it is this time the young wolf's aunt coaching him to be scary and fierce.  Meanwhile, the young wolf dreams of again playing with his friend, Kapitoshka, and awaits a message from a crow.

In 1981, based on the children's novel by Lewis Carroll, the cartoon Alice in Wonderland was released by Kyivnaukfilm in three parts on Ukrainian television.

In 1984, the Kievnauchfilm studio shot the cartoon How Petryk Pyatochkin Counted Little Elephants (Yak Petryk Pyatochkin slonykiv rakhuvav, Ukrainian: Як Петрик П'яточкин слоників рахував, Russian: Как Петя Пяточкин слоников считал), written by the character-children's writer Natalia Guzeeva. In this cartoon, a playful kindergartner named Petryk Pyatochkin counts elephants to fall asleep, then has a dream about playing with elephants.

In 1988, Volodymyr Dakhno, Anatoliy Havrylov, and Eduard Kirych were awarded the Shevchenko National Prize of Ukraine for their work on the Cossacks cartoon series.

Modern Ukraine 

After the collapse of the Soviet Union, many of Kyivnaukfilm's archives were lost or destroyed.  Following Ukrainian Independence Day in 1991, many animators made commercials and ads as government financing ceased.  Nonetheless, the descendent company of KyivNaukFilm, UkrAnimaFilm, continued to create animation. Among these were the first Ukrainian animated film to win the Berlin Film Festival's "Silver Bear" for the cartoon 2002 "The Tram Was Going, Number Nine", and receving awards in Yalta, Stutgart, Talinn, and Kyiv as well.  Creative partnerships with Western European entities resulted in the creation of new animations even during difficult times. 

In addition to Kyivnaukfilm's successor, UkrAnimaFilm, other Ukrainian animation studios came into existence.  The Borisfen Animation Studio was founded in 1990, and formed a partnership with France. The Odesa Animation Studio was founded September 19, 1991.  The animation studio, Animagrad, was founded in Kyiv in 2012 and creates films for international audiences.

Ukrainian animators mixed old traditions with new, such as with the 2005 Russian-Ukrainian stop-motion short film "Poverty" (Zlydni).   In 2014, UkrAnimaFilm released the first Ukrainian feature-length animated film called "Babay" and two years later the 3-D animated film "Nikita the Tanner or The Dragon Spell," which was shown at the Marche du Film in Cannes and won the National "Golden Top" award.  In 2016, UkrAnimaFilm released a revival of the earlier Cossacks cartoon series.

In 2017, Kharkiv residents worked together to create a stop-motion animation called "Believe in Me" about a dark-skinned girl named Matilda.  The animation character Matilda dreams of becoming a pianist, like her grandfather, but her dentist parents decide that the daughter should devote herself instead to the medical profession. A ten-minute animation filmed at 30 frames per second, the community film was set to premier in fall 2017.

New Ukrainian animation works include the 2019 Image Pictures "Clara & the Magic Dragon" and the 2020 Animagrad "Mavka: The Forest Song", previously presented at the Cartoon Movie European animation forum in 2017. 

In 2022, the Ukrainian cartoon "Stolen Moon. Kum", with director and screenwriter Olga Zakharova, won "Awards of Excellence" at the Canada Shorts Film Festival.

See Also 

 Cinema of Ukraine
 KyivNaukFilm
 Volodymyr Dakhno
 Shevchenko National Prize

References 

Ukrainian
Cultural history of Ukraine